The Strangers: Prey at Night is a 2018 slasher film directed by Johannes Roberts, with a script co-written by Bryan Bertino and Ben Ketai, is a sequel to The Strangers and the second installment of The Strangers film series. Starring Bailee Madison, Lewis Pullman, Christina Hendricks, Martin Henderson, and Damian Maffei, the plot follows a family vacationing to a secluded mobile home park, where they are attacked by three masked strangers.

Development of the film began in August 2008, with Rogue Pictures had confirmed that a sequel was in the works, with Bertino co-writing the screenplay with Ketai. It was originally slated to enter principal photography in 2009, during which time it was tentatively titled The Strangers: Part II. Directors Laurent Briet and Marcel Langenegger were considered to direct, but landed eventually to Roberts. After a troubled development period, filming to the sequel began on May 30, 2017.

The Strangers: Prey at Night was released in the United States on March 9, 2018, and grossed $32.1 million worldwide on a budget of $5 million. The film received mixed reviews from critics, with some considering it to be more entertaining than its predecessor and appreciated its satire of horror films, while others noted it as inferior to the original and called it clichéd.

Plot 
Ten years after the events of the first film, in a secluded trailer park in Kalida, Ohio, the three masked strangers — Dollface, Pin-Up Girl, and the Man in the Mask — arrive in a truck at night to a couple's trailer. Dollface wakes a sleeping female occupant by knocking at the front door. When she investigates, she sees Dollface already in the house, who kills her offscreen and then lies down in bed next to the woman's sleeping husband.

Sometime later, Mike and his wife Cindy take a trip with their children, Luke and Kinsey, to their aunt and uncle's trailer park to spend time together before Kinsey leaves for boarding school. After arriving, an unmasked Dollface knocks at their front door and asks for Tamara, but is turned away by Cindy. Kinsey and Luke go for a walk and stumble upon a trailer with the door open. Inside, they find their aunt and uncle's dead bodies (the couple killed in the opening scene).

Back at the family trailer, Dollface knocks a second time and is again turned away. Troubled by the encounter, Mike and Cindy go find the kids, who are in hysterics. Mike follows Luke back to the trailer to find the bodies, while Cindy and Kinsey return to the trailer. They find the cell phones smashed to pieces before Dollface appears and kills Cindy. Kinsey escapes through the trailer roof. Mike and Luke find the voicemail that Cindy left for their uncle in the trailer, realizing that the offenders were waiting for them to arrive. After fending off the Man in the Mask with a gun, they head back to the family trailer, where they find Cindy dead. They then drive their minivan around shouting for Kinsey, before the Man in the Mask throws a brick at the windshield, causing the van to crash. Mike is impaled with a wooden plank before giving Luke the gun and telling him to go find his sister. After Luke leaves, Mike is killed by the Man in the Mask with an ice pick.

Kinsey encounters Dollface and is stabbed before being rescued by Luke who points a gun at Dollface, threatening to shoot her. They instead go into another trailer and bandage up Kinsey’s wounds, before the Man in the Mask drives his truck into the trailer. They escape and Luke hides Kinsey under a porch for safety. When he runs to the general store to call for help, Luke realizes he's not alone and escapes out to the swimming pool, where he overpowers and kills Pin-Up Girl. An angry Man in the Mask approaches and attacks Luke, stabbing him in the back and leaving him to die in the pool. Kinsey finds Luke and rescues him before setting off to find help.

A deputy finds a disheveled Kinsey, but before he can assist, he is killed by Dollface. Kinsey is able to use the Deputy's shotgun to overpower and kill Dollface. The Man in the Mask arrives in the truck and totals the police SUV to prevent Kinsey from escaping. She uses her cigarette lighter to ignite a gasoline leak from both trucks, blowing them both up. The Man in the Mask, however, survives the explosion and continues pursuing her in his truck engulfed in flames. He exits and falls to the ground. Kinsey flags down a passing truck for help, but they attempt to flee when they see the Man in the Mask appear, still alive, behind Kinsey. She climbs into the back-end with the Man in the Mask in pursuit, but manages to knock him off of the truck by bashing him in the head with a baseball bat, finally killing him.

Some time later, Kinsey is at a hospital with Luke recovering from his injuries. As Kinsey awakens from a nightmare, she hears the jack-in-the-box toy noise she heard earlier when encountering Dollface, along with a knock at the door.

Cast

Production

Development
Rogue Pictures' producers announced that a sequel to The Strangers was in development in August 2008, tentatively titled The Strangers: Part II. In a 2009 listing published by Bloody Disgusting, it was reported that the script would be written by Bryan Bertino and the film directed by Laurent Briet. In 2010, the horror website Shock Till You Drop reported that Relativity Media put The Strangers: Part II on hold because they decided the film might not be in their interest, despite the fact that Universal Pictures was willing to distribute it. However, Rogue Pictures confirmed in January 2011 that the sequel was again in production, and was then scheduled to begin filming as early as April 2011; in a press release, Rogue revealed the plot would concern "a family of four who have been evicted from their home due to the economy, and are paid a visit by the same three strangers from the first film."

According to Liv Tyler, star of the original film, Part II was slated for release in 2014, but that did not occur. In 2015, The Wrap reported that the sequel was in production, and that Relativity Media and GK Films had scheduled the film for a December 2, 2016, release date, though it was later removed from the schedule.

Roberts said that while he was in Los Angeles, the producers of 47 Meters Down met him for dinner and asked if he could read a script called Prey At Night. He liked the script and wondered if he wanted to get involved in a sequel despite having released the first film years before but finally accepted and decided to add his personal touch.

Casting
In February 2017, it was announced that Johannes Roberts would be the sequel's new director, and that filming would commence during the summer of the same year. In May 2017, Christina Hendricks, Bailee Madison, and Lewis Pullman were reported as the film's stars, and production began in Los Angeles on May 30. In June 2017, it was announced Martin Henderson had also joined, along with the other main cast members.

Filming
Filming began in June 2017 in Covington, Kentucky, Kincaid Lake State Park in Falmouth, Kentucky and lower Cincinnati which concluded on July 10, 2017.

Release
On October 12, 2017, Collider reported the film would be released on March 9, 2018, by Aviron Pictures. A teaser trailer for the film was released on November 16, 2017. The official trailer debuted on January 5, 2018.

Box office
In the United States and Canada, The Strangers: Prey at Night was released alongside The Hurricane Heist, Gringo, and A Wrinkle in Time, and was projected to gross around $7 million from 2,464 theaters in its opening weekend. It made $4 million on its first day, including $610,000 from Thursday night previews. It went on to debut to $10.4 million, finishing third at the box office behind Black Panther and A Wrinkle in Time.

Critical reception
The website's critics consensus reads, "The Strangers: Prey at Night may appeal to fans of the original who've been jonesing for a sequel, but its thin story and ironic embrace of genre tropes add up to a bloody step back." On Metacritic, the film has a weighted average score of 48 out of 100, based on 25 critics, indicating "mixed or average reviews". Audiences polled by CinemaScore gave the film an average grade of "C" on an A+ to F scale, down from the "B−" given to the first film.

It received mostly positive reviews from fans of the genre. Bloody Disgusting gave the film a positive review, saying, "The Strangers: Prey At Night really takes The Strangers to the next level, and serves as a perfect introduction to The Strangers for new horror fans. You can go back and watch The Strangers and be just as happy for their previous relentless onslaughts”. IGN also praised the film, writing that "Skillfully made, spooky, stylish, and featuring some quite good character work, The Strangers: Prey at Night stands much taller than the 2008 original. The central killers are plenty scary, and some of the images on display would make John Carpenter proud." Writing for /Film, Candice Frederick also gave the film a positive review with a 7/10 rating, writing that "Though its characters may fumble and its winks to the first film may not be as slick as I'd like them to be, Prey at Night does maintain the original commitment of presenting horror to the most mundane. It doesn't just disrupt an innocent setting of a quiet suburb...It is that relentless seclusion, heightened by a haunting soundtrack of otherwise harmless songs."

Brian Douglas from The Hollywood Reporter praised the tone of the film, writing, "While the original Strangers was devoid of any sense of the 80s, instead opting for a kind of timeless modern quality, Roberts' sequel boasts its stylistic debts, with everything from camera shots, and music choices culled from the 80s, forming an impressionistic collage of a time period that feels made for the big-screen." Staci Wilson writing for Dread Central also praised the film, writing “Aside from the quick setup introducing the targets, The Strangers: Prey at Night really is a nonstop thrill ride. I know it's a cliché, but sometimes you've just got to call it as you see it. I was breathless from start to finish. Kudos to Roberts on his best movie yet! He was wise to amp up the atmosphere with a kick-ass original score and flawless cinematography."

Glenn Kenny of The New York Times gave the film a mixed review and compared sequences of the film to Lucio Fulci's Zombi and the slasher film The Mutilator, adding: "If you recognize those films, you might find yourself mildly diverted by this tawdry, occasionally effective shock-delivery device. Watching it with a demonstrative crowd in a Times Square theater proved to this former grindhouse devotee that sometimes you can go home again, at least momentarily. That said, the movie's ludicrously drawn-out finale sapped the good will out of some of my fellow audience members." Kimber Myers of the Los Angeles Times also gave the film a mixed review and wrote that “...although the film is as slim and poorly balanced as a cheap knife, The Strangers: Prey at Night is a stylish 1980s throwback that packs plenty of terror into its short running time. This isn't a horror movie that will take up residence in your nightmares for weeks, but the sequel to the solid 2008 original The Strangers is nonetheless just as effective in the short term as its well-made counterparts”. Owen Gleiberman, writing for Variety, described the film as "Friday the 13th with four victims and three Jasons... [it's] shameless in its bluntly misanthropic family-of-lambs-to-the-slaughter violence, its blithe depravity that's more fetishized than felt. It doesn't take much, though—as it didn't in the '80s—to create a one-weekend horror hit."

The Guardians Benjamin Lee gave the film more of a negative review, rating the film 2/5 stars despite praising Hendricks' performance, noting: "...it's just difficult to really invest in what happens to any of them. Before long, characters are all making stock horror movie decisions, and there's no amount of effective craftsmanship that can sell stupidity. Audience members will be too busy sighing at the screen to be scared."

References

External links
 
 
 
 

The Strangers (film series)
2018 films
2018 horror films
2010s American films
2010s British films
2010s English-language films
2010s serial killer films
2010s slasher films
American sequel films
American serial killer films
American slasher films
British sequel films
British serial killer films
British slasher films
Films about dysfunctional families
Films about vacationing
Films directed by Johannes Roberts
Films shot in Kentucky